Elizabeta Samara (born 15 April 1989 in Constanța) is a professional Romanian table tennis and a three-time European champion. She is currently the player of CSA Steaua București. Samara previously represented Fenerbahçe SK.  She has represented Romania at three different Olympics, in 2008, 2012 and 2016.

On 26 July 2022, she agreed on terms with Greek club Panathinaikos.

Samara is an ethnic Aromanian, and was born in a family of Aromanians.

References

External links
 London 2012 
 
 Tibhar Profile 

1989 births
Living people
Sportspeople from Constanța
Aromanian sportspeople
Romanian people of Aromanian descent
Romanian female table tennis players
Fenerbahçe table tennis players
Panathinaikos table tennis players
Romanian expatriates in Italy
Romanian expatriate sportspeople in Turkey
Table tennis players at the 2008 Summer Olympics
Olympic table tennis players of Romania
Table tennis players at the 2012 Summer Olympics
Table tennis players at the 2016 Summer Olympics
Table tennis players at the 2015 European Games
Universiade medalists in table tennis
Universiade bronze medalists for Romania
Table tennis players at the 2019 European Games
European Games silver medalists for Romania
European Games medalists in table tennis
Expatriate table tennis people in Japan
Medalists at the 2011 Summer Universiade
Table tennis players at the 2020 Summer Olympics